The ninth season of The Real Housewives of New York City, an American reality television series, is broadcast on Bravo. It premiered on April 5, 2017, and is primarily filmed in New York City, New York. Its executive producers are Andrew Hoegl, Barrie Bernstein, Lisa Shannon, Pam Healy and Andy Cohen. The season focuses on the lives of Bethenny Frankel, Luann D'Agostino, Ramona Singer, Sonja Morgan, Carole Radziwill, Dorinda Medley and newcomer Tinsley Mortimer.

Cast

Jules Wainstein departed the cast after one season. She was replaced by Tinsley Mortimer.

Episodes

References

External links

 

2017 American television seasons
New York City (season 9)